Ezzat Goushegir  (Persian: عزت گوشه‌گیر) is a fiction writer and playwright born in Iran and living in the U.S. since 1986.

She has published four books in Persian, including two collections of short stories.

She began her play writing career in 1976, when her first play "Beginning of Bloom" was produced for Iranian National Television followed by the “Middle East Odyssey” at Culture and Art
Hall in Tehran. She received her MFA from the University of Iowa.

Since coming to the United States she has been writing both in English and Persian. Her plays have been produced by a number of theater companies U.S., Canada, China, England, Sweden and Iran. She currently contributes a weekly memoir and many other writings to Shahrvand, the Persian-language magazine based in Toronto, and since 2003 she teaches at DePaul University in Chicago.
She is a regular contributor to literary journals, and her writing has appeared in publications in Iran, Europe, and Canada.  She was a Fellow Writer in the Iowa City International Writing Program, contributed in the Conference of International Women’s Playwrights, was a Writer-in- Residence at the University of Maryland, also has been a co-director and dramaturge of a reading series at New Federal Theatre in New York. She is the member of “The Dramatists Guild of America” and “The Association of Writers and Writing Program”.

Works/Publications
 The Bride of Acacias
 
 Behind the Curtains, the Story of Tahereh (recipient at a
Norman Felton award)
 The Woman, the Room, and Love
 ... And  Suddenly the Leopard Cried: WOMAN
 Metamorphosis, a collection of two plays
 
 Maryam’s Pregnancy (Won a Richard Maibaum award)
 Migration in the Sun a book of poetry.
 Medea Was Born in Fallujah (anthologized in Witness and Crawdad in 2006) Vol. 20 Issue 1, p181-188, 8p. 
 Now Smile (anthologized in Witness and Crawdad in 2006)
 Beginning of Bloom
 The Woman Reluctantly Said Goodbye (Persian Edition), 2013.

External links
 Official website of the author
 Author's Blog
 Research Conversation | Nasrin Navab and Ezzat Goushegir on “My Name is Inanna”
 Playwright: Ezzat Goushegir
 List of Ezzat Goushegir's other literary works
 Ezzat Goushegir's profile at DePaul University, Chicago
 Ezzat Goushegir- International Writing Program
 Ezzat Goushegir at Poetry Foundation

References

Iranian writers
Living people
Iranian emigrants to the United States
University of Iowa alumni
DePaul University faculty
International Writing Program alumni
Year of birth missing (living people)